Sheila Spenser Hooper (born 1925) was a British botanist and plant collector noted for traveling to gather plants from around the world, including India, Tanzania, and Kenya.  She was a specialist on Cyperaceae and a curator at Kew Gardens. She described over fifty species.

References 

1925 births
Living people
20th-century British botanists
20th-century British women scientists
Women botanists
British women curators